Schirman is a German surname, in Russia written as Ширман. Notable people with the surname include:

Daria Schirman (1874–?), Russian physician and embryologist

See also
 Schirmann
 Scherman
 Schurman
 Schürmann

German-language surnames